El proceso de las señoritas Vivanco ("The Process of the Vivanco Girls") is a 1961 Mexican film directed by Maurcio de la Serna. It stars Sara García.

Cast
 Sara García - Doña Hortensia Vivanco y de la Vega 
 Prudencia Grifell - Doña Teresa Vivanco y de la Vega 
 Manolo Fábregas - Jorge Saldaña / Ernestito
 José Luis Jiménez - Don Esteban Larios
 Aurora Alvarado - Cristina
 Rafael del Río - Jaimito 
 Miguel Ángel Ferriz - Coronel Pedro Tejedo
 Carmen Salas - Trinidad Ortega (Trini)
 Manuel Arvide - Fiscal
 Miguel Arenas - Juez
 Luis Aceves Castañeda - General / Jefe de policía
 Celia Tejeda - La Mayora
 Celia Manzano - Inés, celadora
 Fanny Schiller - Doña Conchita
 Queta Lavat - Profesora de gimnasia

References

External links
 

1961 films
Mexican comedy-drama films
1960s Spanish-language films
1960s Mexican films